Dead Peer Detection (DPD) is a method of detecting a dead Internet Key Exchange (IKE) peer. The method uses IPsec traffic patterns to minimize the number of messages required to confirm the availability of a peer. DPD is used to reclaim the lost resources in case a peer is found dead and it is also used to perform IKE peer failover.

References
 RFC 3706 -  A Traffic-Based Method of Detecting Dead Internet Key Exchange (IKE) Peers

IPsec